Onoba mighelsii is a species of minute sea snail, a marine gastropod mollusk or micromollusk in the family Rissoidae.

Distribution

Description 
The maximum recorded shell length is 3.3 mm.

Habitat 
Minimum recorded depth is 4 m. Maximum recorded depth is 574 m.

References

 Abbott R. T. (1974). American Seashells. The marine mollusca of the Atlantic and Pacific coast of North America. II edit. Van Nostrand, New York 663 p. + 24 pl: page(s): 74 
 Brunel, P., L. Bosse, & G. Lamarche. (1998). Catalogue of the marine invertebrates of the estuary and Gulf of St. Lawrence. Canadian Special Publication of Fisheries and Aquatic Sciences, 126. 405 p.
 Gofas, S.; Le Renard, J.; Bouchet, P. (2001). Mollusca, in: Costello, M.J. et al. (Ed.) (2001). European register of marine species: a check-list of the marine species in Europe and a bibliography of guides to their identification. Collection Patrimoines Naturels, 50: pp. 180–213
 Trott, T.J. 2004. Cobscook Bay inventory: a historical checklist of marine invertebrates spanning 162 years. Northeastern Naturalist (Special Issue 2): 261 - 324.

Rissoidae
Gastropods described in 1851